Colonel Rasheed Alade Shekoni started his military career as a young boy in the Nigerian Military School where he did his form 1 to form 5 before moving to the Nigerian Defence Academy (NDA).

He was a Military Administrator of Jigawa State from August 1996 to August 1998 during the military regime of General Sani Abacha, and then of Kwara State from August 1998 to May 1999 during the transitional regime of General Abdulsalami Abubakar.

He built the Rasheed Shekoni Specialist Hospital in Dutse, capital of Jigawa state, but it was then abandoned for ten years before it could be equipped and put to use.
In Kwara State he completed building the 360-unit Adinimole Housing Estate. However, the succeeding government of Mohammed Lawal took four years to allocate the flats. Reportedly they then went to Lawal's favorites.

References

Nigerian Army officers
Year of birth missing (living people)
Living people
Governors of Kwara State
Governors of Jigawa State